Colquiri Municipality is the fourth municipal section of the Inquisivi Province in the  La Paz Department, Bolivia. Its seat is Colquiri.

Geography 
Some of the highest mountains of the municipality are listed below:

References 

 Instituto Nacional de Estadistica de Bolivia

Municipalities of La Paz Department (Bolivia)